The European Lunar Exploration Association (Euroluna) is a Danish-Italian-Swiss team led by Palle Haastrup, which is participating in the Google Lunar X Prize Challenge.

The team 
The members of the Euroluna team are:
Palle Haastrup
Søren Rasmussen
Tor Foss Mortensen
Sten Haastrup
Erik Haastrup
Mogens Rasmussen
Signe Terkelsen

Lunar Rover 
, EuroLuna was designing a lightweight solar-powered four-wheeled Luna Rover called ROMIT, which will be pared down to just 110 pounds by minimising redundant systems.

References

Sources 
 News article in Danish
 Euroluna website

See also 

 Lunar Rover
 Lunokhod programme

Google Lunar X Prize
Cancelled spacecraft